The 2015 Florida Gators softball team represented the University of Florida softball program during the 2015 NCAA Division I softball season.  The Gators defeated Michigan in three games in the final of the 2015 Women's College World Series, clinching back-to-back titles for the program.  Lauren Haeger was named Most Outstanding Player of the WCWS.

Roster
The 2015 Florida Gators softball team has 6 seniors, 5 juniors, 3 sophomores, and 6 freshmen.

Schedule

Regular season

Postseason

Ranking movement

References

Florida Gators softball seasons
Florida Gators softball team
Florida Gators softball team
Florida
Women's College World Series seasons
NCAA Division I softball tournament seasons